Carlo Furno (2 December 1921 – 9 December 2015) was an Italian cardinal of the Catholic Church.

Early life and career
Furno was born in Bairo, Piedmont, in 1921. He was educated at the diocesan College at Ivrea and later at the Seminary of Ivrea, where he studied philosophy and theology. He was sent to the Theological Faculty, Crocetto Salesian Athenaeum in Turin, (1948–1949) and later the Pontifical Roman Seminary, Rome where he took a doctorate in utroque iure, both canon and civil law, (1953). Furno was summoned to the elite Pontifical Ecclesiastical Academy, Rome from 1951 to 1953 where he took practical courses in diplomacy. After his priestly ordination on 25 June 1944 and six years of pastoral work in his home diocese, he began a career in the diplomatic service of the Holy See.

He worked in a subordinate role in Colombia, Ecuador and Jerusalem, and then in the Secretariat of State.  Following these assignments and episcopal consecration on 16 September 1973, he served as Apostolic Nuncio (Papal Ambassador) successively to Peru, Lebanon, Brazil and Italy.

Cardinal
He was created Cardinal-Deacon of Sacro Cuore di Cristo Re on 26 November 1994. After ten years he opted to become Cardinal Priest of that church. From 2005 until his death in late 2015 he was Cardinal-Priest of Sant'Onofrio, in recognition that the church is  the Order's headquarters after the 15 August 1948, motu proprio of Pius XII establishing that the Order's headquarters should be transferred from Jerusalem to Rome. Pope John Paul II appointed him Grand Master of the Equestrian Order of the Holy Sepulchre of Jerusalem on 16 December 1995. The aforementioned Order, like the Knights of Malta, is a member of many international bodies and has observer status at others (such as the United Nations).

Cardinal Furno resigned this office in June 2007 and was succeeded by American Archbishop John Patrick Foley, who had been serving as the President of the Pontifical Council for Social Communications, an important department of the Roman Curia.

Cardinal Furno died on 9 December 2015 at the age of 94.

References

1921 births
2015 deaths
People from the Province of Turin
21st-century Italian cardinals
20th-century Italian Roman Catholic titular archbishops
Apostolic Nuncios to Brazil
Pontifical Roman Seminary alumni
Pontifical Ecclesiastical Academy alumni
Cardinals created by Pope John Paul II
Apostolic Nuncios to Peru
Apostolic Nuncios to Italy
Apostolic Nuncios to San Marino
Apostolic Nuncios to Lebanon
Grand Masters of the Order of the Holy Sepulchre